James Cooper (May 8, 1810March 28, 1863) was an American lawyer, soldier, and politician, who served in the United States Congress.

Biography

James Cooper was born in Frederick County, Maryland on May 8, 1810. He lived much of his life in Gettysburg, Pennsylvania. He served in the Pennsylvania House of Representatives and was its Speaker for a year. He represented Pennsylvania in both the United States Senate and the U.S. House.

When the American Civil War started, Cooper raised a brigade of volunteers in Maryland and was appointed brigadier general of volunteers in May 1861. His brigade served in Franz Sigel's division during the Shenandoah Valley Campaign. In poor health, he was assigned as commandant of Camp Chase, a military staging, training and prison camp near Columbus, Ohio, where he died in 1863.

James Cooper is buried in the Mount Olivet Cemetery, near his birthplace in Frederick, Maryland.

See also

List of American Civil War generals (Union)
Speaker of the Pennsylvania House of Representatives

References

External links

1810 births
1863 deaths
People from Frederick County, Maryland
Members of the Pennsylvania House of Representatives
Speakers of the Pennsylvania House of Representatives
United States senators from Pennsylvania
Pennsylvania lawyers
Union Army generals
People of Pennsylvania in the American Civil War
People from Gettysburg, Pennsylvania
Whig Party United States senators
Washington & Jefferson College alumni
Whig Party members of the United States House of Representatives from Pennsylvania
Burials at Mount Olivet Cemetery (Frederick, Maryland)
19th-century American politicians
19th-century American lawyers